Andre Nunley (born May 22, 1974) is a former American soccer player who played for the Colorado Rapids in the MLS and the MLS Pro-40 in the A-League.

Career statistics

Club

Notes

References

1974 births
Living people
American soccer players
Association football defenders
Colorado Foxes players
Colorado Rapids players
MLS Pro-40 players
Major League Soccer players
A-League (1995–2004) players